Let's Go Jungle!: Lost on the Island of Spice is a joystick-mounted gun arcade game by Sega. The game was released on June 27, 2006. Players take the roles of Ben and Norah stranded on a jungle island which has been overrun by monsters. Each player must shoot the monsters with his or her machine guns while looking for rescue.

There is a version of the game called Let's Go Jungle! Special, in which players sit on a revolving seat with a large projection screen in front and another in back. This version also serves as a spiritual sequel to The House of the Dead 4 Special.

A sequel, called Let's Go Island: Lost on the Island of Tropics, was released in mid-2011. A spiritual sequel, Transformers: Human Alliance was released in 2014.

Gameplay
Let's Go Jungle!: Lost on the Island of Spice is an on-rails arcade shooter. Players assume the roles of dysfunctional couple Ben and Norah, who are going on an island tour to work out their problems. Co-op is available as a mode of play, though one may play alone as well. Players must make their way across the island of Spice, while killing mutated animals and insects, such as frogs, leeches, spiders, water bugs, piranhas, pillbugs, fleas, and flies, along the way. The players are given FN FAL assault rifles early in the game to fend off the creatures, and this will be the primary weapon for use against the creatures. However, sometimes improvised weapons, such as paddles and slingshots, will have to be used. All weapons are controlled by a light gun controller on a mounted fulcrum, similar to another Sega on-rail shooter, The Ocean Hunter. The "Deluxe" Arcade Cabinet allows players to sit inside a model offroad truck.

Some parts of every level are quick-time events, where players must move the gun in a certain direction, rapidly tap a button or tap a button at the right time to survive a dangerous situation. Higher points are awarded for executing quick-time events sooner, where failure will cause the player's life bar to decrease, although the bar will drop to 1% (and stay there) if the player missed a quick-time event with only a little bit of life remaining, as it is not possible for a game over to occur during any particular sequence of quick-time events.

At the end of each stage, the player must battle a boss, which is usually a heavily mutated and powerful monster. To attack it, the player must quickly shoot at each of several indicated target points that are marked on the boss until they disappear. Failure to hit all targets within a short period of time will allow the boss to attack the player and deal massive damage, while hitting all targets will deal damage to the boss and disrupt its attempted attack. Bosses are extremely powerful such that the player can only survive at most two attacks from a boss before having to continue.

Similar to The House of the Dead 4 Special, the games co-op gives a compatibility rating based on how well the two players work together. Enemies include various bugs, spiders, piranhas and frogs. The font style of the texts used throughout the game is based on the Thai alphabet.

Story
Ben and Norah, whose relationship is floundering, tour an island in Asia, Amoi Island. However, when going on a tour, they find that mutant giant insects are wreaking havoc, and they are desperate to escape from disaster. At the beginning of the tour by jeep, Ben appears nervous, while Norah attempts to calm him down until a group of tarantulas chases the jeep. A guide with a hat tells the couple to sit down until he is killed by a large tarantula, terrifying the both of them. They are then given FN FAL assault rifles by another tour guide, which will be used to defend themselves against the spider swarms. Another tour guide gets killed by the tarantula, then both Ben and Norah encounter another group of tourists. Eventually, their vehicle goes off the road with a swarm of mutant dragonflies and crashes; however, before they can ask the driver what happened, the driver exits the vehicle and runs away in panic. They immediately discover why; a giant purple tarantula has found them. They manage to escape it by driving their vehicle over a broken bridge, jumping over a cliff in the process. Ben's map shows them that they have two options for where to go next: a cave or a river.

If the player(s) choose(s) the cave, Ben and Norah find a trio of survivors and escape the cave with them thanks to an SOS sign made with rocks. They all escape the cave by sliding down a cave waterslide thanks to the help of a grandson. Ben and Norah escape, but take a fork in the road to the right where the cave spiders are. They all succeed, including the grandpa and grandson, escaping the cave. One of the survivors claims that Ben and Norah are not helping them and declares himself the leader, taking their guns. Before they can protest further, a rescue helicopter arrives. Ben and Norah are temporarily given the grandson's slingshots to defend themselves. Eventually, they reach the helicopter but find it doesn't have enough room for them. The pilot informs them that there is another extraction point in a nearby village from which they can evacuate the island, and they are given their guns back. As the helicopter takes off, they are attacked by a giant mantis. Upon killing the mantis, they discover that they are standing in front of a Buddha shrine, to which Norah comments: "It really is mysterious Asia".

If the player(s) choose(s) the river, Ben and Norah ride a canoe down the river, attacked by poisonous tree frogs. At one point, they lose their guns in the waterfall and have to use oars to defend themselves. Eventually, they retrieve their guns and have to fight a giant mutant bullfrog. They defeat the frog by shooting a tall propane tank near the frog. Upon killing the frog that explodes into green goo, they find a radio that tells anyone listening about a nearby village where they can escape via helicopter.

On the third stage (which is compulsory to play on), the player(s) travel through an abandoned village, only to be attacked by more tarantulas and mutated fleas, as they leave the village they are attacked by giant pillbugs. They must also travel across several stone pillars by pressing the button at the right time to avoid the attention of another large purple tarantula (similar to the one seen on the first stage). They cross a river (due to a nearby bridge being broken) and must fight off schools of mutated piranha fish, the tree frogs again, and several mutated water bugs. They hear a young boy calling for help, but Ben and Norah are forced not to use the guns because that will hurt the elephant. The player must use the buttons to help him save his elephant by hitting mutated fleas off its body with the buttstock of their rifles. The fleas get off the elephant and the boy then thanks them by letting them ride his elephant to the helicopter pad, which will help them escape the destroyed village and break the gate open. On the way, they encounter yet the same tarantula, this time with mushrooms growing out of its back. The player fatally injures it but does not kill it, instead, it falls off the cliff that they are on, right into the sea.

The player then arrives at a Buddhist temple as the boy tells a simple backstory of what happened before the duo came and explains the temple was for the natives first, soldiers next, and the "good people" last. As they are safe for now, they are interrupted by spiders and the infected tarantula. The infected tarantula seen before returns and lunges at the player from above, when the player kills it, the tarantula falls to the Buddhist shrine and detonates several barrels of toxic waste in the process, causing an explosion that results in the lily plant pods around the shrine to become contaminated and grow teeth. They then merge into one giant mutant plant, which the player must fight. It is eventually defeated with help from the boy, who commands his elephant to kick a barrel of explosives at the plant, which the player must continuously shoot until it blows up and kills the plant.

After the battle, the boy thanks to the players for their help and notes that he didn't help enough, so he gives Norah his good luck charm that keeps bugs at bay. He decides to make a new one as a helicopter arrives in the area. As the helicopter arrives, Ben and Norah hop into the helicopter and head home. As they both take a ride in a helicopter, several butterflies land on the head of the Buddha statue (which is supposedly still contaminated from the tarantula's mutant blood), which then mutate and pursue the main protagonists in the final battle stage.

In the course of their adventure, Ben and Norah learn the story behind the island. According to the boy of the island and a helicopter pilot, an environmental NGO called "Green Leaves", came to the island after it was devastated by war. Following the motto of "bring back the green", scientists of "Green Leaves" discovered a species of mushroom that possessed extraordinary biological regenerative properties. The scientists extracted and refined the mushrooms' essence, creating a powerful chemical extract that could accelerate biological growth. In cooperation with the island's natives, "Green Leaves" used the chemical extract to restore the island's fauna and flora within five years. However, it was later discovered that the extract's properties also had the unfortunate side effect of enlarging, mutating, and corrupting any treated organisms, turning them into dangerous monsters that threatened the safety of the island's inhabitants. "Green Leaves" personnel and many of the island's natives managed to evacuate to safety, although several natives decided to remain behind for other reasons.

As they rest and understand the story, the two must battle with a mutated butterfly and its butterfly army while aboard their helicopter ride out of the island. Just as they beat the giant butterfly to within an inch of life, it launches one desperate attack that blows the two out of the helicopter, forcing them to drop their guns into the water and cling onto a rope ladder. Without any other weapons to destroy this menace, the two must use a slingshot and the good luck charm to deliver the final blow which will affect the endings. If the player(s) fail to deliver the final blow, the butterfly escapes the island and the two of them will end their relationship, only to discover that the pilot has been infected with the mushroom substance, demonstrating that humans can be infected and affected by it and implying that the rest of the world could plunge into chaos as the infection spreads across humanity. If the player(s) successfully make the shot, the butterfly is killed and the two continue their escape from the island with a sense of joy while beginning to enter into a romantic relationship. The pilot being infected is omitted in this ending.

Reception
The title featured in 16th place in a 2022 Retro Gamer list of the Top 25 Light Gun Games, with critic Ashley Day praising its co-operative play and compatibility mechanic whereby players are rewarded for shooting in sync with one another.

Let's Go Island: Lost on the Island of Tropics
Released in mid-2011, this is the sequel to the game. Taking place on a Pacific island, the protagonists are a goofball New Zealander guide called Zack and a nerdy Canadian girl called Beth. While on a tour, their tour boat collides with another boat with a small group of pirates landing on the boat after crashing and are being chased by sharks after landing in the sea. Beth and Zack fight the sharks with the pirates' weapons (water gun or AKS-74U, depending on how the game is configured), but the pirates fall off the boat. Then, the captain tells both Zack and Beth that "we hit the reef," but the boat is able to dodge the obstacles. As the protagonists jump off the boat and the boat crashes through the dock, they grab a rope and go through a short underwater adventure with mutant starfish, squids, and other sea creatures. After the rope cuts off, both go up to the sea surface with a windsurfing board. There, the captain is killed by a gigantic octopus.

Though the duo manage to escape from the octopus and survive a big wave, they must go to an airport in order to get off the island. Either they go by a scooter in the OpaOpa Villa and Resort, jet ski in unfinished underground concert hall, or the buggy to the South Island Golf Course while surviving mutant creatures from air, land, and sea. As they adventure through, the abandoned island is revealed to have a backstory. Before the game, Zack became an employee and worked at the resort. After a financial crisis came into the resort, the resort went out of business and Zack was sacked, closing down the entire island and changing Zack's career. As they travel to the airport, they lose their weapons, but find other items that can be treated as temporary firearms.

When they arrive and board a biplane after surviving the second level with temporary weapons, the pilot demands "to show them what they have" mistaking them for the pirates. Beth wonders what is the pilot talking about, but the plane gets attacked by a giant queen bee. As the plane tries to fly, the weight is too much and the pilot forces the duo to get off. Both Zack and Beth jump off the plane, then to a cliff with a parafoil in the bag. After defeating the giant queen bee, they survive the fall.

Zack and Beth are then "rescued" and kidnapped by the pirate leader, and are forced to retrieve some treasure from beneath the sea, which the leader is told of by the pilot. As they swim, they encounter stingrays, jellyfish, and starfish that attack, then meet a dolphin. Later, and when they hit the bottom of the ocean, they find another dolphin trapped in the net and the octopus from before, which had survived. Zack and Beth lift the net, free the dolphin, and get the tube. Both swim to the top as the octopus puts up a fight with a backup team of squids. After retrieving the treasure and ending the octopus once and for all, the pirates are shocked to see that the tube they sought does not contain treasure. Luckily, a lighter was in a tube and was in working condition, which Beth didn't care about. The leader flies into a fit rage, saying that the pilot lied to them, and kicks an old "Green Leaves" barrel filled with ominous chemicals, which he'd somehow stole and stowed on board. The chemicals spread to a field of coral, creating a giant monster. Zack and Beth fight back by using the boats cranes and then get a ride with the dolphins they rescued, starting a chase. After the chase, the coral monster grabs them and attacks by using its barnacle teeth, the duo then shoot at the monsters mouth revealing oil inside of it.

After the monster throws them near the plane's crash site by a sneeze, they lost their weapons, making Zack lose his confidence until Beth motivates Zack. They manage to kill the monster by shooting it with a firework into its mouth. When they blow up the monster, its remains break up into debris and rain gold, which happens to be the actual treasure. While being stranded at sea after the battle and awaiting rescue, the two then began to start a relationship as they face toward a sunset before the credits begin to roll. In another good ending if both players get an average score from 90 to 100, Zack removes Beth's broken glasses to reveal Beth's pretty face. This is also triggered if one player beats a game with a perfect S rank, but should they fail to hit the target, the monster will chase after the firework and the two will not develop romance, triggering a bad ending.

Transformers: Human Alliance

Released in 2014, this is a spiritual sequel to the previous games. Outside of the city, Bumblebee and NEST agent Vanessa escort the civilian Jake, who is carrying a device with him, out of the city. Jake's call to Sam Witwicky is suddenly cut off, and numerous Decepticons begin to pursue them along the highway. Bumblebee arms the humans with guns to help them fight back, but even with the assistance of NEST and Optimus Prime, the three are cornered by drones under the command of Starscream. The team attempts to flee, but Starscream forces them off the road by throwing a tanker truck at them. Outside of a nearby factory, Starscream once again corners them and attacks, the humans join Bumblebee in fighting back. Saving their Autobot friend from Starscream's grasp, the Decepticon grabs them briefly before they blast their way free, but in doing so, Jake drops the device, which is promptly stolen by Laserbeak. They continue to fight off Starscream's attacks until Optimus Prime shows up, plowing into the scheming Decepticon and ending the fight. Though Optimus threatens him, Starscream has already won, retrieving the device from Laserbeak and they both depart.

If the player(s) choose(s) to go to the England Central City, they investigate the epicenter of an earthquake, where NEST is ambushed by drones under the command of Soundwave. Vanessa and Jake, now accompanied by Sideswipe, respond to the team's request for back up, taking on the numerous drones. However, the enemy's numbers soon prove too much for them to handle and Sideswipe is forced into a tunnel, with Soundwave himself giving chase. Despite some impressive (and in Jake's case, stomach-churning) acrobatics, Soundwave catches up to them as they reach a bridge, forcing the Autobot to take on both him and Laserbeak. With some human assistance, Sideswipe is victorious and the group finish crossing the bridge. Moving at high speed through the city, they take on more pursuing drones from both the land and the sky. NEST headquarters radios in to confirm the presence of another Decepticon, at which a tank rolls into view and fires a barrage of missiles. Sideswipe manages to survive the assault. The tank transforms into Brawler, who promptly releases another volley of missiles. The team take out the missile turrets one at a time, but Brawler simply tosses Sideswipe aside, now focusing his fury on Vanessa and Jake. Eventually, the hefty Decepticon is brought down by the humans' attack. Optimus Prime appears, demanding to know if the Decepticons are behind the earthquake, but Brawler succumbs to his injuries before Optimus can get any information out of him.

If the player(s) choose(s) to go to the North Africa Desert, Vanessa and Jake accompany Optimus Prime to Africa, following the source of the earthquakes. When they arrive, the town appears to be deserted, until they realize they have walked directly into an ambush. Despite the Autobot's best efforts, the humans have to fend off everything from mechanical buzzards to hordes of creepy insects before Optimus helps them make their getaway over the city's rooftops. But no sooner that they reach the outskirts of the city the ground rips up before them, and they are confronted by Shockwave. Optimus transforms and flees, taking the humans into the desert while pursued by Shockwave and an army of drones. Before they can be overwhelmed, Sideswipe appears to add his support, but Shockwave eventually gets ahead of the Prime, forcing him into a one-on-one conflict. With the humans' help, Optimus prevails, but Shockwave escapes before he can be finished off and they are once again forced to flee from the drones and take on the colossal and heavily armed Scorponok King. A hectic chase results in the beastly Decepticon being literally disarmed and brought down, with Optimus impaling it with its own tail to finish it off. Sideswipe catches up to the group just as they recover the device, which is revealed to be the cause of the global quakes, and Optimus realizes that Megatron has led them on a wild goose chase.

The Decepticons have launched a massive assault on a West Coast city. As a squadron of NEST fighter jets accompany Optimus, Bumblebee and their human companions, Vanessa seems shocked at the carnage, but Jake seems unusually confident right up until parts start falling off their stolen Decepticon fighter. Optimus splits from the group as Bumblebee flies the humans through the city, taking out several other fighters sent to intercept them. Their good fortune doesn't last, when their squadron is attacked by Skywarp, forcing them deeper into the city. Optimus eventually rejoins them and, despite Skywarp's impressive skills in teleportation, he is no match for the Prime and the humans' coordinated attacks and is easily killed. Optimus covers the rear as Bumblebee takes point into the depths of the city. They soon catch up with the Decepticon ship, and are confronted by a goading Megatron. Optimus demands answers for all that has gone on, but Megatron seems more interested in the humans and attacks Bumblebee's ship. Optimus and Megatron start to duke it out as the warship launches missile after missile at Bumblebee's fighter, causing Jake more distress with his weak stomach. Jake spots an entrance into the warship and the team blasts their way inside for cover. After clearing out a wave of drones, Vanessa takes note of the Energon nodes and they promptly go to work destroying them to cripple the ship. Before they can take out the last one, Starscream makes his reappearance, almost taking the heads off the humans before being blasted back into the node. The ship explodes, but Jake's celebration is cut short by an abrupt transmission from Optimus, asking them to converge on his and Megatron's position.

Bumblebee and his human companions crash land somewhere in Canada, having followed Optimus' signal. Instead of their leader, they find Megatron who gloats that Optimus is already dead. He then directs their attention to the nearby Energon tower, and boasts that its power will win him not only Earth, but Cybertron as well, but not before dealing with Jake and Vanessa. Megatron gives chase both in the air and on the ground, and with the Energon tower interfering with Bumblebee's capabilities, it is up to the humans to fend off the Decepticon leader as best they can. Things are made even more complicated when Megatron summons the other drones to attack, eventually corralling them. Brought to a halt, Megatron simply tosses Bumblebee aside and prepares to terminate the humans. Suddenly he is blasted away, and Megatron is shocked to see it is a very much alive Optimus, who vows to end Megatron's plan. The two clash once again, Jake and Vanessa now able to add their firepower to the mix and together, the three of them bring Megatron to his knees and defeat him. Before they can finish off Megatron, another earthquake shakes the whole area. Vanessa notes that the Energon tower has gone out of control, with Bumblebee adding that its power will destroy the entire Earth. NEST back up arrives in the form of Sideswipe and a squadron of troopers, and Optimus orders everyone to destroy the tower before it is too late. The threat is finally over, but Jake quickly notices that Megatron has made his escape. Optimus notes in a message that the battle with the Decepticons will continue, and that as long as they are on Earth, no harm will come to the human race.

See also 
The Ocean Hunter
Deadstorm Pirates

References

External links
Official Let's Go Jungle!: Lost on the Island of Spice website (Japanese with some English)
Official Let's Go Island!: Lost on the Island of Tropics website

2006 video games
Arcade video games
Arcade-only video games
Sega arcade games
Rail shooters
Video games about insects
Video games developed in Japan
Video games featuring female protagonists
Video games scored by Takenobu Mitsuyoshi
Video games set in forests
Video games set in Oceania
Video games set in Thailand
Video games with alternate endings
Works about vacationing
Multiplayer and single-player video games